The 2011 FINA Men's Water Polo World League was the tenth edition of the annual event, organised by the world's governing body in aquatics, the FINA. After a preliminary round, the Super Final was held in Firenze, Italy from June 21–26, 2011. Serbia ended up being champions, defending the title acquired the previous year and was the first team to qualify for the 2012 Olympic men's water polo tournament.

Preliminary round

Africa
The African tournament was supposed to be held in Algiers, Algeria from May 13–15, but was cancelled.

Americas 
The American preliminary round was held in Costa Mesa, California, United States from May 13–15. United States advanced to the Super Final.

Asia/Oceania 
 
The Asia and Oceania region was feature a two-legged tournament, in Auckland, New Zealand (May 9–13) and Sydney, Australia (May 16–20). The four teams played a round robin in each location, with the results from both legs combined. Australia and China advanced to the Super Final.

Europe

Europe was divided into three groups of four teams, with qualifying spots for the winner of each group as well as Super Final host Italy. Rather than the condensed tournament style competition of the other continents, the European matches were played in a home-and-away format over five months.

Group A

Group B

Group C

Super Final

The Super Final was held in Firenze, Italy from June 21–26.

Group A

June 21

June 22

June 23

Group B

June 21

June 22

June 23

Quarter-finals
June 24

Medal round

5th–8th places

Final ranking

Awards
The awards were announced on 1 July 2011.

References

External links
 FINA official website – Water Polo World League

2011
W
FINA
International water polo competitions hosted by Italy